is a railway station on the high-speed Sanyo Shinkansen in Higashihiroshima, Hiroshima, Japan, operated by West Japan Railway Company (JR West).

Lines

Station layout
The station has two side platforms serving two tracks, with two centre tracks for passing trains. The station has a "Midori no Madoguchi" staffed ticket office.

Buses

History
The station opened on 13 March 1988.

See also
 List of railway stations in Japan

References

External links

  

Railway stations in Hiroshima Prefecture
Sanyō Shinkansen
Railway stations in Japan opened in 1988